Madan Krishna Shrestha  is a Nepali actor, comedian, writer, singer, song writer, director and producer.  He is one of the most successful and respected comedians in the Nepali entertainment industry and was the most popular stage performer of his time.

He is well known for his method acting. He is one of the comedy duo from MaHa Jodi, the other one being Hari Bansha Acharya. He also performs on stage most of the time with his partner, Hari Bansha Acharya. He has sung many hit Nepal Bhasa and few Nepali songs. He has been suffering from Parkinson's disease. The Maha Jodi has produced a lot of Drama & Telefilms based on sociopolitical sector of Nepal.

Awards
Madan Bhandari National Award
Jagadamba Shree Puraskar

Filmography

As an actor

Images

References

External links
 

Nepalese male comedians
Newar
1950 births
Living people
Actors from Kathmandu
20th-century Nepalese male actors
Nepalese male film actors
Newar-language singers
Newar-language lyricists
Dohori singers
20th-century Nepalese screenwriters
Nepalese memoirists
Jagadamba Shree Puraskar winners